is a scenic area located in Shimizu-ku, Shizuoka, Japan.

It was selected by the Tokyo Nichi Nichi Shimbun and Osaka Mainichi Shimbun as one of the top 100 Landscapes of Japan in 1927 and a National Place of Scenic Beauty of Japan  in 1954. 

The Nihondaira Ropeway connects Nihondaira to Kunōzan Tōshō-gū in 5 minutes. The area lends its name to the home stadium of J.League football team Shimizu S-Pulse, who play at Nihondaira Stadium.

Access
By bus: from Shizuoka Station or Higashi-Shizuoka Station of JR Tōkaidō Main Line.
By car: from Shizuoka IC or Shimizu IC of Tōmei Expressway.

See also
List of Places of Scenic Beauty of Japan (Shizuoka)

References

Shizuoka (city)
Landforms of Shizuoka Prefecture
Tourist attractions in Shizuoka Prefecture
Places of Scenic Beauty
Plateaus of Japan